Festuca kurtziana is a species of grass in the family Poaceae. It is native to Argentina, and Central Chile. It is perennial and mainly grows on subalpine or subarctic biomes. It was first published in 1927.

References

kurtziana
Angiosperms of Argentina
Angiosperms of Chile
Plants described in 1927